Euscelis lineolata is a leafhopper species in the family Cicadellidae. It is found in Europe, North Africa, and western Asia.

References

Athysanini
Hemiptera of Africa
Hemiptera of Asia
Hemiptera of Europe
Taxa named by Gaspard Auguste Brullé
Insects described in 1832